Aaron Anderson may refer to:
 Aaron Anderson (Medal of Honor) (1811–1886), Union Navy sailor and Medal of Honor recipient
 Aaron Anderson (basketball) (born 1991), American basketball player
 Aaron Anderson (soccer) (born 2000), Australian professional soccer player